Kristen Condon is a film and television actress from Melbourne, Australia.

Filmography 
Sizzler 77 directed by Timothy Spanos
The Second Coming directed by Richard Wolstencroft
Under a Kaleidoscope directed by Addison Heath
Start Options Exit directed by Christopher H Mitchell and Yoav Lester
Chocolate Strawberry Vanilla directed by Stuart Simpson
Jugular directed by Jeremy De Ceglie
Makeover directed by Donald Mark Percy
Ricky the Movie directed by Liam Firmager
The Beautiful and Damned directed by Richard Wolstencroft
John Safran's Race Relations directed by Craig Melville
Remembering Nigel directed by Frank Howson
Landfall directed by Travis Bain

Awards 
Won best actress for her role in Under a Kaleidoscope at the 2015 Melbourne Underground Film Festival
Nominated best actress for her role in Under a Kaleidoscope at the 2015 Maverick Movie Awards
Won best actress for her role in Landfall at the 2018 Oz International Film Festival (Melbourne)

References 
 "Kristen's Fantastic Fest Four" The Herald Sun, 15 September 2015
 "Under a Kaleidoscope" Beat Magazine, 9 September 2015
 "MUFF 2015: Underground Giants Embrace Alt-Sector Ingenue" Screen-Space, 6 September 2015
 "Don Percy's Makeover a Tropfest Triumph" IF Magazine, 16 December 2013
 "Movie Review: The Beautiful and Damned" Underground Film Journal, 22 August 2009
 "A Sordid, yet timid, melodrama" SBS, 1 July 2010

External links

References

Living people
Year of birth missing (living people)
Australian film actresses
Australian television actresses